or  is a  long river which flows northwards, ending up as a tributary to the river Ranelva at Hjartåsen in the small village of Storvoll in the Dunderland Valley in the municipality of Rana in Nordland county, Norway.  The river should not be confused with the nearby stream, also named Messingåga, which flows into the river Ranelva from the east, just north of the village of Dunderland.

The river is located in an untouched natural area, in one of the most important areas of wetland birds in Rana. It is very rich with Arctic char and trout, and has been proposed to be preserved both by environmental organizations and by the Norwegian parliament.

Path
From the small lake of Kjerringvatnet, the river Kjerringelva flows in an eastern direction. This river meets the stream Jarfjellbekken, which flows in a northern direction from the tarn Jarfjelltjønna through Austerskardet, north of the lake Kopparvatnet.  Messingåga has its beginning at Elivollan, where the Kjerringelva and Jarfjellbekken meet.

The river flows in a northern direction, through the Messingdalen valley, east of the mountain Messingen.  On its way northwards, the river absorbs (from the west) five brooks flowing from the mountain Jarfjellet, and (from the east) it also absorbs another five brooks from the mountain Kjerringfjellet and one brook from the mountain Harafjellet.

Messingåga flows through an area of moraines and deposits from glacial rivers.  On its way to lake Kopparvatnet, it flows through an area of mounds and knots of moraines (kettle area).

Power production
In 2005, the MiljøEnergi Nordland AS electric company delivered a formal application to the Norwegian Water Resources and Energy Directorate, in order to get a license to use parts of Messingåga to produce electricity.

See also
List of rivers in Norway

References

Rana, Norway
Rivers of Nordland
Rivers of Norway